The list of parties to the Treaty on the Prohibition of Nuclear Weapons encompasses the states which have signed and ratified or acceded to the Treaty on the Prohibition of Nuclear Weapons, a multilateral treaty outlawing nuclear weapons.

On 20 September 2017, the treaty was opened for signature. Following Article 15 of the treaty, it entered into force on 22 January 2021 after it had been ratified by 50 states. States that did not sign the treaty before then may only accede to it.

A total of 197 states may become parties to the Treaty on the Prohibition of Nuclear Weapons, including all 193 United Nations member states, the Cook Islands, the Holy See, the State of Palestine and Niue. As of 22 September 2022, 68 states have ratified or acceded to the treaty, most recently the  Democratic Republic of the Congo and the Dominican Republic.

States Parties 
According to the treaties database maintained by the United Nations Office for Disarmament Affairs, as of 22 September 2022, the TPNW has 68 parties: 65 states have ratified it, and another 3 have acceded to it.

* United Nations non-member observer states

Signatory states 

As of January 2023, the following 27 states have signed but not ratified the TPNW.

See also 

 List of parties to the Biological Weapons Convention
 List of parties to the Chemical Weapons Convention
 List of parties to the Convention on Certain Conventional Weapons
 List of parties to the Comprehensive Nuclear-Test-Ban Treaty
 List of parties to the Treaty on the Non-Proliferation of Nuclear Weapons
 List of parties to the Ottawa Treaty
 List of parties to the Partial Nuclear Test Ban Treaty
List of parties to weapons of mass destruction treaties

References 

Prohibition of Nuclear Weapons
Prohibition of Nuclear Weapons
Nuclear warfare
Nuclear weapons policy